A Bird That Doesn't Sing is a 2015 South Korean television series starring Oh Hyun-kyung, Hong Ah-reum, Kang Ji-sub, Kim Yu-seok, Baek Seung-hee, and Ahn Jae-min. It aired on tvN, premiering on May 4, 2015 on Mondays to Thursdays at 21:40 (KST) time slot.

Synopsis
A 10 billion won insurance murder case causes Oh Ha-nui (Hong Ah-reum) to lose everything. She sets out to take revenge upon Chun Mi-ja (Oh Hyun-kyung) who caused her misfortune.

Cast

Main
 Oh Hyun-kyung as Chun Mi-ja
 Hong Ah-reum as Oh Ha-ni
 Kang Ji-sub as Park Sung-soo
 Kim Yu-seok as Oh Nam-kyu
 Baek Seung-hee as Oh Yoo-mi
 Ahn Jae-min as Lee Tae-hyun

Supporting
 Baek Seung-hoon as Chun Soo-chang
 Jang Do-yoon as Oh Min-ki
 Jung Yoon-seok as young Oh Min-ki (special appearance)
 Han Seo-jin as Oh Min-ji
 Kang Kyung-hun as Jo Dal-yun
 Lee Kyung-shim as Hong Soo-yun
 Park Hye-jin as Han Yeo-sa
 Han Ga-rim as Seo Bong-sook
 Choi Sang-hoon as Park Eui-won
 Chang Hee-soo as Jo Hye-won
 Joo Min-ha as Park Sung-hee
 Kim Gye-sun as Woong-yi's mother
 Choi Su-rin as Min Ha-kyung
 Cha Seung-yun as Min Hae-kyung
 Lee Jung-hoon as Ha-ni's father
 Jang Hee-soo
 Lee Jong-goo

Notes

References

External links
  
 

TVN (South Korean TV channel) television dramas
2015 South Korean television series debuts
2015 South Korean television series endings
Korean-language television shows
South Korean melodrama television series
Television series by Mega Monster